Korolikha is a rural locality (a village) in Zadneselskoye Rural Settlement, Ust-Kubinsky District, Vologda Oblast, Russia. The population was 186 as of 2002. There are 3 streets.

Geography 
Korolikha is located 34 km north of Ustye (the district's administrative centre) by road. Kuryanikha is the nearest rural locality.

References 

Rural localities in Tarnogsky District
Kadnikovsky Uyezd